Fatiha Boudiaf (November 28, 1944 in Oran) is an Algerian activist, widow and second wife of former Algerian President Mohamed Boudiaf. After his assassination in 1992, she set up the Boudiaf Foundation to spread her husband's message of peace. She has been an outspoken critic of the conviction of Lambarek Boumaarafi, saying that a larger conspiracy was involved in the death of her ex-husband and has demanded that the investigation is reopened.

Death of Mohamed Boudiaf
Boudiaf was the second wife of the Algerian President Mohamed Boudiaf. She has denounced the official investigation of her husband's assassination, suggesting that it was not the work of a lone fanatic but part of a greater plot. She has attempted to visit Lambarek Boumaarafi, the man who was convicted of the murder of her husband, while he is in prison, but this request has been refused by the authorities.

She has theorised that the person who killed her husband hid under the table in front of him at the time and is yet to be arrested. In 2016, she accused four former senior army officers of the murder of her husband, and sent an open letter to the former President, Abdelaziz Bouteflika, demanding that the case was reopened.

Activism work
She has set up the Boudiaf Foundation, for which she received the Prince of Asturias Award for International Cooperation in 1998. The foundation is set up in honour of Boudiaf's deceased husband, and hopes to spread a message of peace and education for all citizens of Algeria. Each year on the anniversary of his death, it celebrates his life.

References

1944 births
Living people
First ladies of Algeria
20th-century Algerian politicians
21st-century Algerian people